Colombana is a name shared by several wine and table grape varieties including:

Colombana nera
Besgano bianco, which is also known as Colombana bianco
Verdea (grape), which is also known as Colombana and Colombana bianco